These are squads of the Chilean national basketball team at international tournaments: 

1936 Olympic Games: finished 10th among 21 teams

Luis Carrasco, Augusto Carvacho, José González, Eusebio Hernández, Luis Ibaseta, Eduardo Kapstein Suckel, Michel Mehech

1948 Olympic Games: finished 6th among 23 teams

Eduardo Cordero Fernández, Ezequiel Figueroa Reyes, Juan José Gallo Chinchilla, Roberto Hammer Casadio, Eduardo Kapstein Suckel, Manuel Ledesma Barrales, Víctor Mahana Badrie, Luis Enrique Marmentini Gil, Andrés Mitrovic Guic, Antonio Moreno Rodillo, Eduardo Parra Rojas, Hermán Raffo Abarca, Marcos Sánchez Carmona, Guillermo Verdugo Yañez

1950 World Championship: finished 3rd among 10 teams

Rufino Bernedo, Víctor Mahana, Pedro Araya, Luis Enrique Marmentini Gil, Exequiel Figueroa, Juan José Gallo, Marcos Sánchez Carmona, Eduardo Cordero Fernández, Hernán Ramos, Raul Emilio López, Juan Ostoic, Mariano Fernández (Head Coach: Kenneth Davidson)

1952 Olympic Games: finished 5th among 23 teams

Pedro Araya Zabala, Rufino Bernedo, Eduardo Cordero Fernández, Hugo Fernández Diez, Ezequiel Figueroa Reyes, Juan José Gallo Chinchilla, Víctor Mahana Badrie, Eric Mahn Godoy, Juan Ostoic, Hermán Raffo Abarca, Hermán Ramos Muñoz, Álvaro Salvadores, Orlando Silva Infante

1954 World Championship: finished 10th among 12 teams

Pedro Araya, Víctor Mahana, Hernán Raffo, Juan Zitko, Raul Emilio López, Juan Ostoic, Antonio Torres, Milenko Skoknic, Raúl Urra, Rolando Etchepare, Dante Gianoni, Salomón Awad (Head Coach: Kenneth Davidson)

1956 Olympic Games: finished 8th among 15 teams

Hernán Raffo, Juan Ostoic, Luis Salvadores, Maximiliano Garafulic, Orlando Etcheverre, Orlando Silva, Pedro Araya, Raúl Urra, Rolando Etchepare, Rufino Bernedo, Victor Mahaña (Head Coach: Juan Arredondo)

1959 World Championship: finished 3rd among 13 teams

Rufino Bernedo, Luis Salvadores, Juan Zitko, Rolando Etchepare, Orlando Silva, Orlando Etcheverre, Juan Guillermo Thompson, José de la Fuente, Maximiliano Garafulic, Dante Gianoni, Bruno Luchsinger, Domingo Sibilla (Head Coach: Luis Valenzuela)

Roster for 2014 FIBA South American Championship.

At the 2016 South American Basketball Championship:

|}

| valign="top" |

Head coach

Assistant coaches

Legend

Club – describes lastclub before the tournament
Age – describes ageon 26 June 2016
|}

At 2020 FIBA AmeriCup Qualifiers:  

|}
| valign="top" |
Head coach

Assistant coaches

Legend
Club – describes lastclub before the tournament
Age – describes ageon 23 February 2020
|}

References

rosters